Hold My Heart may refer to:

Hold My Heart (film), a 2002 Norwegian drama film directed by Trygve Allister Diesen
"Hold My Heart" (song), a song by Lindsey Stirling
"Hold My Heart", a song by Steps from the album What the Future Holds
Hold My Heart, an EP by He Is We